IBC Airways is an FAR Part 135 on-demand airline headquartered in unincorporated Broward County, Florida, near Fort Lauderdale. IBC Airways operates on-demand cargo services to the Caribbean. Its main bases are Miami International Airport (MIA) and Fort Lauderdale-Hollywood International Airport (FLL). In 2005, IBC Airways began offering on-demand passenger services.

History
The airline was established in 1991. It developed out of Joseph Costigan's recognition that the Caribbean market was not sufficiently serviced by the legacy airlines.

It previously had its head office in Building 101 in unincorporated Miami-Dade County in Greater Miami.

The airline had previously flown flights from Fort Lauderdale to the Leeward airfield at the Guantanamo Bay Naval Base.

Destinations

IBC Airways operates the following freight services:

Domestic and territorial destinations:
Florida
Miami
Fort Lauderdale

International destinations:
Bahamas
Freeport
Marsh Harbour
Nassau
Cayman Islands:
Grand Cayman
Cuba:
Havana
Dominican Republic:
Santiago de los Caballeros
Haiti:
Cap-Haïtien
Port-au-Prince		
Jamaica:
Kingston
Montego Bay
Turk and Caicos Islands:
Providenciales

Fleet

The IBC Airways fleet comprises the following aircraft (as of October 2020):

The airline fleet previously included the following aircraft (as of May 2019):
 5 Fairchild Swearingen Metroliner

References

External links
IBC Airways

Cargo airlines of the United States
Regional Airline Association members
Airlines established in 1991
Companies based in Broward County, Florida
Airlines based in Florida
1991 establishments in Florida
Regional airlines of the United States